Batiscanie is the watershed of the Batiscan River, located in the center of the province of Quebec, Canada, covering 4690 km² on the North Shore of the St. Lawrence River. The area covered by Batiscanie is 53% in the administrative région of Mauricie and 47% in the administrative region of the Capitale-Nationale.

The territory of the Batiscanie is 87% forest areas (especially in the Middle and Upper Batiscanie) and 7% rivers, lakes and wetlands.

The Batiscan River Valley is designated "Batiscanie" in publications of several historians.

In 2010, MAPAQ counted 217 farms in operation in Batiscanie.

Located in the southern Laurentians, Upper Batiscanie generally includes public land tenure. Agricultural activities are rare because of the climate, soil type, accessibility and low population. The use of this area is mainly focused on forestry, recreational and tourism. Upper Batiscanie counts a thousand lakes. The population density is very low.

The Batiscanie has two physiographic regions: the Laurentian Shield occupying 75% of the northern area, and the lowlands of the St. Lawrence covering the southern territory.

The Batiscan River takes its source at Lac-Édouard, Quebec (Mauricie) and descends on 196 km in a north-south direction to empty into the St. Lawrence River, in Batiscan. This watershed is located between the basin of the Saint-Maurice River, Métabetchouane River to the North, Champlain River to the South-West and the Sainte-Anne River in the East.

Geography 

The Batiscan River rises in the Edward Lake (lac Édouard), in the municipality of Lac-Édouard and Mauricie. The watershed is located between the basin of the Saint-Maurice River in the West, the Métabetchouane River in the North, Champlain River in the Southwest and one of the Sainte-Anne River in the South-East.

The Batiscanie has ten major sub-basins covering an area of over  each, feeding the  main river Batiscan:
 des Envies (Mékinac Regional County Municipality and Les Chenaux) 
 Tawachiche (Mékinac Regional County Municipality) 
 à Pierre (Portneuf Regional County Municipality) 
 White River (Rivière Blanche) (Portneuf Regional County Municipality) . Note: Although the White River flows into the Rivière-à-Pierre at the height of Rivière-à-Pierre village, its watershed is sufficient to be treated separately.
 Miguick (Portneuf Regional County Municipality) 
 Lightning (rivière aux éclairs) (La Jacques-Cartier Regional County Municipality and agglomeration of La Tuque) 
 Moïse River (Quebec) (rivière Moïse) (La Jacques-Cartier Regional County Municipality) 
 Jeannotte (agglomeration of La Tuque) 
 Edward Lake (Lac-Édouard) (agglomeration of La Tuque) 
 Lac aux Biscuits (agglomeration of La Tuque) .

The last sub-basin includes all other streams (with an area of less than ) and directly related to the Batiscan.

The Batiscanie has 103 dams on its territory and only one is used for hydroelectricity, 71 are listed in the administrative region of Mauricie and 32 in the region of the Capitale-Nationale. Dams impoundments (generally not more than a meter high) are used for wildlife or recreational uses and resort

Municipalities and unorganized territories 

The only three municipalities whose territory is 100% in Batiscanie are: Saint-Stanislas, Saint-Séverin and Saint-Tite. Municipalities and unorganized territories located in Batiscanie (or holding area) are:

U.T. = Unorganized Territory

Population in Batiscanie 

According to 2011 Canadian census, Batiscanie was inhabited by 16,140 residents over an area of 2838 km² organized in 13 municipalities. In 2002, there were 16 500 inhabitants. Only 10.6% of the population of Batiscanie lives north of Lac-aux-Sables, a territory representing 58.6% of the Batiscanie. The most populous municipality in the watershed is Saint-Tite, followed by Sainte-Thècle. The municipality with the largest area is Lake Edward, followed by Rivière-à-Pierre.

Municipalities of Batiscanie 
Municipalities of the territory of Batiscanie are:

1. Lac Édouard

Lake Edward in the heart of the Haute-Mauricie (High Mauritian) forest, located at 65 km east of La Tuque. The municipality with 167 inhabitants is integrated into the town of La Tuque. Approximately 980 km ² and counting 300 lakes, the city is the third largest in the Mauricie area. The village which is located on the shores of Lake Edward Island (26 km long), is surrounded by mountains (the Laurentians) and forests. Despite the distance, visitors access by car, train, quad, snowmobile or seaplane. Lake Edward is a paradise for hunting, fishing, water sports, beaches and numerous bays. Services are provided by three and four ZECS outfitters. The municipality has a network of over 26 km of hiking trails. In the history, the Lac-Edouard was known for its hospital and railway station. Its territory includes the proposed biodiversity reserve Seigneurie-of-Triton, Ecological Reserves Judith-De Brésoles, Bog-in-Strips. There is also a wildlife habitat on the island Hoffman.

2. Rivière-à-Pierre

Rivière-à-Pierre is in the Portneuf Regional County Municipality. First designated "mission Canton Bois" (mission of Township Wood), the Township Bois was constituted in 1897. The local economy was mainly based on agriculture and forestry. The new name of the municipality of Rivière-à-Pierre was awarded in 1948. The local Via Rail station serves the village since 1885. The granite is extracted from the surrounding mountains has a worldwide reputation. A replica of the cross of Gaspé was crafted in granite and erected in the village. This cross is half of the height of the original cross of Gaspé erected in Gaspé. The municipality is the gateway to the Portneuf Wildlife Reserve. The Church of St. Bernardin was the heart of the history of the locality. Falls of Marmite are popular with outdoor attractions. Rivière-à-Pierre is a paradise for water sports, camping, hunting, fishing, snowmobile and all-terrain vehicles.

3. Notre-Dame-des-Anges

This town is located at the north-eastern part of the Mékinac Regional County Municipality. With 53 lakes, the land is mostly wooded, while agricultural area accounts for 8% of the territory. The economy of the town was mainly related to the timber industry with 34 sawmills operating in local history. The fall of the legendary "five dollars" is located above the village. Municipalities of Notre-Dame-des-Anges and Montauban-les-mines were merged to become the municipality of "Notre-Dame-de-Montauban".

4. Lac-aux-Sables

With almost 500 chalets built around 47 lakes and three rivers, Lac-aux-Sables is a paradise of resort of mid-Batiscanie region, in the Mékinac Regional County Municipality. The territory count two villages: Lac-aux-Sables and Hervey-Jonction.

With around 300 inhabitants, Hervey-Jonction is the location of the Hervey-Jonction Station that is used today as a switching point for two passenger Via Rail trains (Abitibi and Saguenay). On the religious aspect, the Catholic parish St. Leopold d'Hervey-Jonction can serve the local population. On the civilian side, the sector is integrated into the municipality of Lac-aux-Sables.

Batiscan River cuts the municipal territory into two parts. The right bank of the Batiscan River has two major tributaries, the Tawachiche River and the "Propre River". The main attractions are related to the resort and tourism: five campgrounds, an important camp for students ("Lac en coeur") since 1946, an area of controlled for hunting and fishing (Zec Tawachiche) since 1979, and a beautiful golf club (the Saint-Rémi) since 1970.

5. Sainte-Thècle

This parish town of 2478 (in 2011) is known for its resort especially around lakes Croche and "du Jesuit". The high mountains of Precambrian period located in row St-Joseph and in Township Lejeune (North-West of the municipality) offer exceptional views. Sainte-Thècle is also a paradise for hunting, fishing, snowmobile, all-terrain vehicles and other outdoor activities.

The church, rectory and cemetery, located on the dominant hill of the village are a historical heritage of great interest. The Parc St-Jean-Optimist, located in the Lac Croche is a public site for summertime leisure (swimming, docks, picnic tables ...). The Lawrence Naud promenade, located near the Lac Croche, is an ideal site to view the lake.

The agricultural and forestry industries have marked its history. In the 19th and 20th century, there were many sawmills and flour. The main industries of the 20th century were Groleau Inc, Pierre Naud inc and "Veillet et frères".

The territory of Sainte-Thècle is characterized by three river basins of Batiscanie: the Rivière des Envies, the Pierre-Paul River and Tawachiche River which has a north-south route  entirely in the municipality of Lac-aux-Sables. Thousands years ago, Native American activities has been particularly intense in St-Thomas row, where many aboriginal artifacts were found and are now stored at UQTR (Université du Québec à Trois-Rivières).

6. Saint-Tite

Saint-Tite is the only city in the Batiscanie. The 2011 census counted 3,880 residents there. Agriculture and forestry are the predominant economic sectors. From the early 20th century, the tanning industry and leather processing is located at the point where this small industrial town was designated the "city of leather". Many SMEs have made leather items, such as gloves and boots there. Many items are made in Western style.

With its many shops, Saint-Tite is also a commercial center serving the entire region. Saint-Tite became the chief town of the region, notably in the field of educational administration, as the Commission scolaire de Normandie (1969-1998) clung to his head office. Today, the "École secondaire Paul-le-Jeune", opened in 1969, is the only high school in the MRC. Saint-Tite is also an important center for health and social services. The Mékinac Regional County Municipality (RCM) established its headquarters in Saint-Tite.

The agricultural plain of the St. Lawrence Valley ends at Saint-Tite at the foot of Laurentians. Saint-Tite is located in the watershed of the Rivière des Envies, whose main tributary is the "Little Mekinac River". The major lakes are: Trottier, Perchaude and Pierre-Paul. This lake is the head of the Pierre-Paul River flowing into Sainte-Thècle, Quebec and Saint-Adelphe, Quebec, to throw in the Batiscan River, at the height the village of Saint-Adelphe.

The first settler Francois D'Assise Cossette stood around Lake Kapibouska. The clearing of land began in earnest in 1835. The mission of Saint-Just-de-Kapibouska was recognized in 1851. The Catholic parish of Saint-Tite is canonically founded in 1859, the same year the opening of the post office. Civil erection takes place in 1863 in breaking away from Sainte-Anne-de-la-Pérade, Quebec and Saint-Stanislas-de-la-Rivière des Envies. In 1910, the city of Saint-Tite was incorporated, detaching itself from the municipality of the parish. Finally, in 1998, the Municipality of the Parish and the city got together to form the new city of Saint-Tite.

Inaugurated in 1967 by a large rodeo, Festival Western de Saint-Tite annually attracts up to 800,000 visitors during the 10 days of festivities.

7. Saint-Adelphe

8. Hérouxville

9. Lac-à-la-Tortue

10. Saint-Stanislas

11. Saint-Narcisse

12. Sainte-Geneviève-de-Batiscan

13. Batiscan

The municipality of Batiscan is the oldest parish in the Batiscanie and the only municipality in the Batiscanie to be located on the banks of the St. Lawrence River. The mouth of the Batiscan River is part of its territory. Incorporated as a municipality in 1855, Batiscan is part of the Les Chenaux Regional County Municipality since 2002. Covering an area of nearly 44 square kilometers, the municipality had 941 people at the 2011 census. By highway, Batiscan is thirty minutes from Trois-Rivières and about one hour from province of Quebec. Batiscan is the only parish of the Batiscanie to have a highway segment.

In the Native American prehistory, the territory of Batiscan was occupied at different times by the Iroquois, Algonquin, Montagnais and Atikamekw. The founding of Trois-Rivières in 1634 promoted trade with the Indians and the settlement of Aboriginal communities. In 1639, the Jesuits are given the "Seigneurie de Batiscan" (Lordship of Batiscan), they exploited up to the early 19th century. The first settlers arrived in 1666. The parish of St. Francis Xavier Batiscan was canonically erected in 1684.

Batiscan benefits including a municipal dock on the St. Lawrence River and a ramp to the water, two bike paths, a primary school, a medical clinic. Batiscan has several heritage sites: the old rectory Batiscan, Calvary Lacoursière and the building of the municipal dock. Historically, agriculture, forest, river navigation and fishing have formed predominant economic activities. From the 20th century, the resort and water activities characterize the municipality.

Links with RCM of Batiscanie
 Le Haut-Saint-Maurice Regional County Municipality
 Portneuf Regional County Municipality
 Mékinac Regional County Municipality
 Les Chenaux Regional County Municipality

See also 

Lakes:
 Batiscan Lake, Quebec, in Upper-Batiscanie,
 Lac aux Biscuits in Upper-Batiscanie,
 Croche Lake (Sainte-Thècle), Mid-Batiscanie,
 Lake of the Cross (Lac-Édouard) (Lac à la croix), in Upper-Batiscanie,
 Lake Édouard (Quebec), in Upper-Batiscanie,
 Lac-Masketsi, Quebec, in Mid-Batiscanie,
 Lac Pierre-Paul, in Saint-Tite,

Rivers:
 Rivière-à-la-Lime, in Lower-Batiscanie,
 Veillet River, in Lower-Batiscanie,
 Lightning River (rivière aux éclairs), in Upper-Batiscanie,
 Batiscan River,
 Grand River Bostonnais (Portneuf)
 Rivière des Envies, in Sainte-Thècle, Saint-Tite, Saint-Séverin and Saint-Stanislas
 River des Chutes, in Lower-Batiscanie,
 Jeannotte River, in Upper-Batiscanie,
 Miguick River, in Upper-Batiscanie,
 Moïse River (Quebec), in Upper-Batiscanie,
 Pierre-Paul River, in Mid-Batiscanie,
 Propre River, in Mid-Batiscanie,
 Serpentine River, in Upper-Batiscanie,
 Tawachiche River, Lac-aux-Sablesin Mid-Batiscanie,
 Tawachiche West River, in Lac-aux-Sables in Mid-Batiscanie.

Others:
 Island of the Cross (Quebec) (Île à la Croix), in Upper-Batiscanie,
 Lordship of Batiscan, in Lower and Mid-Batiscanie,
 Lordship of Sainte-Anne-de-la-Pérade, covering Lower and Mid-Batiscanie,
 Batiscan River Park, in Lower Batiscanie.

Areas of controlled development:
 Zec Tawachiche
 Portneuf Wildlife Reserve

References 

Landforms of Mauricie
Capitale-Nationale
Mékinac Regional County Municipality
Watersheds of Canada
Landforms of Quebec